Procope may refer to:

Café Procope, the oldest cafe in Paris
Procopio Cutò, otherwise known as François Procope (1651–1727), a Sicilian chef who founded the Café Procope
Ulla Procopé (1921–1968), a Finnish designer of ceramics
Apheresis, the loss of a word-initial sound